Bhoja I was a medieval Shilahara king of Southern Maharashtra (Kolhapur) on the west coast of India.  

On the death of Guhala 11 in 1055 CE, Bhallala and Bhoja I must have ruled the kingdom. Achugi II, the Sinda ruler of Yelburga, is said to have repulsed a certain Bhoja I who can be only the Shilahara Bhoja I.

References
 Bhandarkar R.G. (1957): Early History of Deccan, Sushil Gupta (I) Pvt Ltd, Calcutta.
 Fleet, J.F. (1896): "The Dynasties of the Kanarese District of The Bombay Presidency", written for The Bombay Gazetteer.
 Department of Gazetteer, Govt of Maharashtra (2002): Itihaas : Prachin Kal, Khand -1 (Marathi)
 Department of Gazetteer, Govt of Maharashtra (1960): Kolhapur District Gazetteer
 Department of Gazetteer, Govt of Maharashtra (1964): Kolaba District Gazetteer
 Department of Gazetteer, Govt of Maharashtra (1982): Thane District Gazetteer
 A.S. Altekar (1936): The Silaharas of Western India.

External links
 Silver Coin of Shilaharas of Southern Maharashtra (Coinex 2006 - Souvenir)

Shilahara dynasty
11th-century Indian monarchs